The following is a timeline of the Kashmir conflict, a territorial conflict between India, Pakistan and, to a lesser degree, China. India and Pakistan have been involved in four wars and several border skirmishes over the issue.

1846–1945: Princely state 
  Kashmir Valley was a Muslim-majority region speaking the Kashmiri language and had a distinct culture called Kashmiriyat.
 
 

 
  The Maharaja accepted these recommendations but delayed implementation, leading to protests in 1934. The Maharaja granted a constitution providing a legislative assembly for the people, but it was powerless.
 
  Soon afterwards, the younger leaders of the Muslim Conference pleaded for broadening the party to include all the people of the state.
 
  Two independent candidates that won were said to have joined the Muslim Conference afterwards.
  At the same time, the National Conference joined the All India States Peoples Conference, a Congress-allied group of movements in princely states.

1946–1947: Kashmir unrest and accession

1946

Early 1947

April 1947 
  The exodus increased in June and continued until August.

May 1947

June 1947

July 1947

August 1947 
 
 
 
 
 
 
 
  According to Major General Henry Lawrence Scott, the Chief of Staff of State Forces, they had been incited by 30 Muslims from West Punjab that entered the State a few days earlier.

September 1947 
 
 
 
 
 
 
 
 
 
 
 
 
 
 
 
  Henry Lawrence Scott, the Chief of Staff of the State Forces left his position. About 100,000 Muslims from East Punjab and an equal number of non-Muslims from West Punjab were safely escorted through Jammu by the State Forces.

October 1947 
 
 
 
 
 
 
 
 
 
 , stated to be the beginning of the 1947 Jammu violence.
 
 
 
 
 
 
  This stalled due to the impending invasion.
 
 
  Thousands of Pashtuns from Pakistan's North West Frontier Province, recruited covertly by the Pakistani Army, invaded Kashmir along with the Poonch rebels, allegedly incensed by atrocities against fellow Muslims in Poonch and Jammu. The tribesmen engaged in looting and killing along the way. Pro-Pakistan members of the Maharaja's army rebelled at Domel (Muzaffarabad) and took control of the Jhelum river bridge.
 
  Batra carried a message from the Maharaja which requested military assistance and proposed accession to India.
  
 
 
 
  until such time as the will of the people could be ascertained.
 
 
 
 
  Tribesmen again poured into Kashmir.

November 1947 
 
 
 
 
 
  6 November became a remembrance day in Pakistan and Azad Kashmir.
 
 
 
 
 
 
 
  The day is remembered as the "Mirpur day" in Indian-administered Jammu.
 
  However, the agreement was vetoed by Jinnah: "No commitments should be made without my approval of terms of settlement. Mr. Liaquat has agreed and promised to abide by this understanding," read his note to the ministers. The next day, India's Defence Committee was informed that Pakistan was reinforcing the tribesmen.

December 1947

1948: War and diplomacy

January 1948

February–April 1948 
 
  No reinforcements were possible due to closure of the Zoji La pass by winter snows. The Ladakhis appealed to Nehru for help.

May 1948

July 1948

August–December 1948

1949–1962: Plebiscite conundrum

1949 
 
  As per the 1948 and 1949 UNCIP Resolutions, both countries accepted the principle that Pakistan would secure the withdrawal of Pakistani intruders followed by withdrawal of Pakistani and Indian forces, as a basis for the formulation of a truce agreement, the details of which were to be determined, followed by a plebiscite. However, the countries failed to arrive at a truce agreement due to differences in interpretation of the procedure for and extent of demilitarisation, one of them being whether the Azad Kashmiri army was to be disbanded during the truce stage or the plebiscite stage.

1950

1951 
  Liaquat Ali Khan displayed a clenched fist in defiance.
  The UN Security Council passed Resolution 91 to the effect that such elections did not substitute a plebiscite.

1952 
 
 
 
 
 
 , which provided for the autonomy of the State within India and the autonomy for regions within the State.

1953 
 
  
 
  Large protests were held in Delhi and other parts of the country.

1954 
 
  He stated his concerns about the cold-war alignments and that such an alliance affects the Kashmir issue. India resisted plebiscite efforts from this point.

1955–1957 
 
  
 
  India's Home Minister, Pandit Govind Ballabh Pant, during his visit to Srinagar, declared that the State of Jammu and Kashmir was an integral part of India and there can be no question of a plebiscite to determine its status afresh. India continued to resist plebiscite efforts.

1959–1962

1963–1987: Rise of Kashmiri nationalism

1963–1969 
 
 
 
  Sheikh Abdullah was released after 11 years.

1970–1979 
 
 
 
  The Plebiscite Front was dissolved and renamed the National Conference. Sheikh Abdullah assumed the position of Chief Minister of Jammu and Kashmir after an 11-year gap.
 
 
  Amanullah Khan was elected as its General Secretary the following year.
  The Mujahideen so recruited would, in the late 1980s, take on their own agenda of establishing Islamic rule in Kashmir.

1980–1986

1987–present: Kashmir Insurgency

1987–1989 
  The MUF candidate, Mohammad Yousuf Shah, a victim of the rigging and state's mistreatment, took the name Syed Salahuddin and would become chief of the militant outfit Hizb-ul-Mujahideen. His election aides called the HAJY group - Abdul Hamid Shaikh, Ashfaq Majid Wani, Javed Ahmed Mir and Mohammed Yasin Malik - would join the JKLF.

1990–1999

2001–2009

2010–2018 
 
 
 
  Indian authorities claimed that this was a vote of the Kashmiri people in favour of democracy of India.

2019-present

 
  
According to a 6 September 2019 report of the Indian government, nearly 4,000 people have been arrested and many were tortured. The report also claimed children were detained, which was later found to be false in December 2019. More than 200 politicians, including two former chief ministers of Jammu and Kashmir (J&K), along with more than 100 leaders and activists from All Parties Hurriyat Conference were detained in the disputed region.

See also 
 Human rights abuses in Jammu and Kashmir
 Rape during the Kashmir conflict
 Women's rights in Jammu and Kashmir
 Stone Pelting in Kashmir
 Exodus of Kashmiri Hindus
 Politics of Jammu and Kashmir
 Elections in Jammu and Kashmir
 History of Kashmir
 Indo-Pakistani wars and conflicts
 Kashmir conflict
 Indo-Pakistani War of 1947
 Sino-Indian War
 Indo-Pakistani War of 1965
 Indo-Pakistani War of 1971
 Kargil War 
 2001–02 India–Pakistan standoff
 Siachen conflict
 Insurgency in Jammu and Kashmir
 India–Pakistan border skirmishes (2014–2015)
 India–Pakistan military confrontation (2016–present)
 2016–17 Kashmir unrest
 Timeline of the Kashmir conflict (1846–1946)
 List of topics on the land and the people of "Jammu and Kashmir"
 List of massacres in Jammu and Kashmir

References

Bibliography

External links 
 Conflict in Kashmir: Selected Internet Resources by the Library, University of California, Berkeley, USA; University of California at Berkeley Library Bibliographies and Web-Bibliographies list
 Kashmir Historical Timeline
 A peep into Kashmir History and timeline

History of Kashmir
Kashmir conflict
Kashmir
Kashmir conflict